The women's doubles of the 2017 Advantage Cars Prague Open tournament was played on clay in Prague, Czech Republic.

Demi Schuurs and Renata Voráčová were the defending champions, but both players chose not to participate.

Anastasia Potapova and Dayana Yastremska won the title, defeating Mihaela Buzărnescu and Alona Fomina in the final, 6–2, 6–2.

Seeds

Draw

References

External Links
Main Draw

Advantage Cars Prague Open - Doubles
Advantage Cars Prague Open